André Corbeau (born 1 April 1950) is a French former professional racing cyclist. He rode in two editions of the Tour de France.

References

External links
 

1950 births
Living people
French male cyclists
Sportspeople from Mayenne
Cyclists from Pays de la Loire